The 2019–20 Boston College Eagles men's basketball team represented Boston College during the 2019–20 NCAA Division I men's basketball season. The Eagles, led by sixth-year head coach Jim Christian, played their home games at the Conte Forum as members of the Atlantic Coast Conference.

The Eagles finished the season 13–19, and 7–13 in ACC play.  They lost to Notre Dame in the second round of the ACC tournament.  The tournament was cancelled before the Quarterfinals due to the COVID-19 pandemic.  The NCAA tournament and NIT were also cancelled due to the pandemic.

Previous season
The Eagles finished the 2018–19 season finished the season 14–17, 5–13 in ACC play to finish in a tie for 11th place. In the ACC tournament they lost in the first round to Pittsburgh.

Offseason

Departures

Incoming transfers

Recruiting class of 2019

Recruiting class of 2020

Roster

Schedule and results

Source:

|-
!colspan=9 style=| Regular season

|-
!colspan=12 style=|ACC tournament

References

Boston College Eagles men's basketball seasons
Boston College
Boston College Eagles men's basketball
Boston College Eagles men's basketball
Boston College Eagles men's basketball
Boston College Eagles men's basketball